Pablo Emanuel Acosta Melo (born 28 February 1990) is a Uruguayan footballer.

References
 
 
 

1990 births
Living people
People from Juan Lacaze
Uruguayan footballers
Uruguayan expatriate footballers
Plaza Colonia players
Deportes Melipilla footballers
Segunda División Profesional de Chile players
Expatriate footballers in Chile
Association football defenders